Biographisches Lexikon des Kaiserthums Oesterreich (English, Biographical Encyclopedia of the Austrian Empire) (abbreviated Wurzbach from the author's surname) is a 60-volume work, edited and published by Constantin von Wurzbach,  containing about 24,254 critical biographies of notable personages in every walk of life and from all parts of the Austro-Hungarian monarchy who were born, lived or worked there during the period 1750–1850.

See also 
 Österreichisches Biographisches Lexikon 1815–1950 (ÖBL)

References

External links 
ws = Text at German-language Wikisource 
alo = Biographisches Lexikon des Kaiserthums Oesterreich at Austrian Literature Online 
  ws alo    Volume 1 (1856): A – Blumenthal
  ws alo    Volume 2 (1857): Bninski – Cordova
  ws alo    Volume 3 (1858): Coremans – Eger
  ws alo    Volume 4 (1858): Egervári – Füchs
  ws alo    Volume 5 (1859): Füger – Gsellhofer
  ws alo    Volume 6 (1860): Guadagni – Habsburg (Agnes – Ludwig)
  ws alo    Volume 7 (1861): Habsburg – Hartlieb
  ws alo    Volume 8 (1862): Hartmann – Heyser
  ws alo    Volume 9  (1863): Hibler – Hysel
  ws alo   Volume 10 (1863): Jablonowski – Karolina
  ws alo   Volume 11 (1864): Károlyi – Kiwisch und Nachträge
  ws alo   Volume 12 (1864): Klácel – Korzistka
  ws alo   Volume 13 (1865): Kosarek – Lagkner
  ws alo   Volume 14 (1865): Laicharding – Lenzi und Nachträge (II. Folge)
  ws alo   Volume 15 (1866): Leon – Lomeni
  ws alo   Volume 16 (1867): Londonia – Marlow
  ws alo   Volume 17 (1867): Maroevic – Meszlény
  ws alo   Volume 18 (1868): Metastasio – Molitor
  ws alo   Volume 19 (1868): Moll – Mysliveczek
  ws alo   Volume 20 (1869): Nabielak – Odelga
  ws alo   Volume 21 (1870): O'Donell – Perényi
  ws alo   Volume 22 (1870): Pergen – Podhradszky und Nachträge (III. Folge)
  ws alo   Volume 23 (1872): Podlaha – Prokesch
  ws alo   Volume 24 (1872): Prokop – Raschdorf
  ws alo   Volume 25 (1868): Rasner – Rhederer
  ws alo   Volume 26 (1874): Rhedey – Rosenauer und Nachträge (VI. Folge)
  ws alo   Volume 27 (1874): Rosenberg – Rzikowsky
  ws alo   Volume 28 (1874): Saal – Sawiczewski und Nachträge (VII. Folge)
  ws alo   Volume 29 (1875): Sax – Schimpf
  ws alo   Volume 30 (1875): Schindler – Schmuzer
  ws alo   Volume 31 (1876): Schnabel – Schröter
  ws alo   Volume 32 (1876): Schrötter – Schwicker
  ws alo   Volume 33 (1877): Schwarzenberg – Seidl
  ws alo   Volume 34 (1879): Seidl – Sina
  ws alo   Volume 35 (1877): Sinacher – Sonnenthal
  ws alo   Volume 36 (1878): Sonnklar – Stadelmann
  ws alo   Volume 37 (1878): Stadion – Stegmayer
  ws alo   Volume 38 (1879): Stehlik – Stietka
  ws alo   Volume 39 (1879): Stifft – Streel
  ws alo   Volume 40 (1880): Streeruwitz – Suszycki
  ws alo   Volume 41 (1880): Susil – Szeder
  ws alo   Volume 42 (1880): Szedler – Taaffe
  ws alo   Volume 43 (1881): Tabacchi – Terklau
  ws alo   Volume 44 (1882): Terlago – Thürmer
  ws alo   Volume 45 (1882): Thugut – Török
  ws alo   Volume 46 (1882): Toffoli – Traubenburg
  ws alo   Volume 47 (1883): Traubenfeld – Trzeschtik
  ws alo   Volume 48 (1883): Trzetrzewinsky – Ullepitsch
  ws alo   Volume 49 (1884): Ullik – Vassimon
  ws alo   Volume 50 (1884): Vastag – Villani
  ws alo   Volume 51 (1885): Villata – Vrbna
  ws alo   Volume 52 (1885): Vrčevic – Wallner
  ws alo   Volume 53 (1886): Wallnöfer – Weigelsperg
  ws alo   Volume 54 (1886): Weil – Weninger
  ws alo   Volume 55 (1887): Weninger – Wied
  ws alo   Volume 56 (1888): Wiedemann – Windisch
  ws alo   Volume 57 (1889): Windisch-Grätz – Wolf
  ws alo   Volume 58 (1889): Wolf – Wurmbrand
  ws alo   Volume 59 (1890): Wurmser – Zhuber
  ws alo   Volume 60 (1891): Zichy – Zyka
 Text file created using optical character recognition at the Internet Archive
 Catalog entry for Stock reprint of 2001 at the German National Library

Austrian biographical dictionaries
Austrian Academy of Sciences Press books